Dellow is a surname. Notable people with the surname include:

Carl-Magnus Dellow (born 1951), Swedish actor
David Dellow (born 1979), Australian triathlete
James Dellow (1887–1970), Canadian long-distance runner
John Dellow (born 1931), British police officer
Ron Dellow (1914–2013), English footballer and manager